Craig Dowd born 26 October 1969 in Auckland, New Zealand is a former rugby union player and ex-coach. He played 60 test matches for New Zealand between 1993 and 2000, spending his entire provincial career with Auckland. He spent his entire Super 12 career, 64 matches, with the Auckland Blues, between 1996 and 2001 and is the official Blues player number 001, winning back-to-back titles in 1996 and 1997. From 2001 to 2005 he played for London Wasps in the Guinness Premiership, amassing 115 caps with the club. He started as Wasps won the 2002–03 Premiership Final, and two years later was a replacement when they won it again. Following his retirement as a player he took on a coaching role with the club. In 2009 he took up a position as the Head coach for North Harbour in the Air New Zealand Cup. Formed one of the greatest frontrow combinations with Sean Fitzpatrick and Olo Brown.

In 2020, he finished season 1 of Match Fit, despite battling weight issues and sciatica. He managed to revert back to his playing weight. He was also the only member with a forklift license.

References

External links

Wasps coaching profile
Wasps playing profile

1969 births
Living people
Wasps RFC players
Expatriate sportspeople in England
New Zealand international rugby union players
New Zealand people of Irish descent
New Zealand rugby union coaches
New Zealand rugby union players
People educated at Liston College
Rugby union props